The 2007 European Juveniles Baseball Championship was an international baseball competition held in Olomouc and Sumperk, Czech Republic from July 10 to 14, 2007. It featured teams from Austria, Bulgaria, Czech Republic, Israel, Lithuania, Poland and Russia.

In the end the team from Czech Republic won the tournament.

Group stage

Pool A

Standings

Game results

Pool B

Standings

Game results

Final round

Pool C

Standings

Game results

Semi finals

3rd place

Final

Final standings

References

External links
Game Results

European Juveniles Baseball Championship
European Juveniles Baseball Championship
International baseball competitions hosted by the Czech Republic
2007 in Czech sport
European Juveniles Baseball Championship
European Juveniles Baseball Championship